Rudin Nako (born 20 May 1987) is an Albanian footballer who currently plays for KF Lushnja in the Albanian First Division.

References

1987 births
Living people
Sportspeople from Fier
Association football defenders
Albanian footballers
KS Albpetrol Patos players
KF Apolonia Fier players
KF Korabi Peshkopi players
KF Bylis Ballsh players
KS Egnatia Rrogozhinë players
KS Lushnja players
Kategoria Superiore players
Kategoria e Parë players